Colonel Henry Bromley (fl. 10 March 1803 – d. 1836) was Member of Parliament for Worcester City from the General Election in October 1806 until he resigned on 13 February 1807, rather than defend a bribery allegation by the defeated candidate.

On 10 March 1803 he inherited the Manorship of Abberley together with the patronage of St. Mary's church in the village.

References

External links

1836 deaths
Year of birth missing
Members of the Parliament of the United Kingdom for English constituencies
UK MPs 1806–1807